Bribie Island may refer to:

 Bribie Island, an island in Moreton Bay, Queensland, Australia
 Bribie Island National Park, a national park on Bribie Island
 Bribie Island Coaches, a bus operator on Bribie Island
 Bribie Island Seaside Museum, a museum on Bribie Island
 Bribie Island Second World War Fortifications, a heritage-listed military installations on Bribie Island
 Bribie Island State High School, a secondary school on Bribie Island